Virotia neurophylla (previously Macadamia neurophylla) is a species of plant in the family Proteaceae. It is endemic to New Caledonia.  It is threatened by habitat loss. It has recently been transferred to the genus Virotia, which is also endemic to New Caledonia.

References

Proteaceae
Endemic flora of New Caledonia
Vulnerable plants
Taxonomy articles created by Polbot